The MTV Europe Music Award for Best Hip Hop has been awarded since 1998. Originally entitled Best Rap, the award was renamed to its current title in 1999. Eminem has won this award nine times.

Winners and nominees
Winners are listed first and highlighted in bold.

† indicates an MTV Video Music Award for Best Hip Hop Video–winning artist.
‡ indicates an MTV Video Music Award for Best Hip Hop Video–nominated artist that same year.

1990s

2000s

2010s

2020s

See also
 MTV Video Music Award for Best Hip Hop Video
 MTV Video Music Award for Best Rap Video

References

MTV Europe Music Awards
Hip hop awards
Awards established in 1999